The Rev. James Roscoe Day, D.D., L.L.D. (17 October 1845 – March 13, 1923) was an American Methodist minister, educator and chancellor of Syracuse University.

Early life and education

Day was born in Whitneyville, Maine, on October 17, 1845 to Thomas and Mary Plummer Hillman Day. He attended Maine Wesleyan Seminary and then studied at Bowdoin College but had to stop due to poor health; he eventually received his degree in 1874. He married Anna E. Richards of Auburn, Maine in 1873.
In 1872, he was ordained a minister of the Methodist Episcopal Church and served as a pastor at Bath, Maine, from 1872 to 1874; Portland, Maine, from 1876 to 1878; Boston, Massachusetts, from 1881 to 1882; New York City, 1883 to 1885 and 1889 to 1893.

Syracuse University 
Day was elected as the fourth chancellor of Syracuse University on Nov. 16, 1893 to succeed Charles N. Sims. He was elected bishop in 1904, but declined the post to stay at Syracuse.

Day is credited with helping to greatly expand the University as several important buildings were constructed during his tenure including the Archbold Gymnasium, Bowne Hall, Carnegie Library, Goldstein Faculty Center, Lyman Hall, Machinery Hall, Slocum Hall, Sims Hall, Smith Hall, Steel Hall and the Tolley Administration Building.

He retired from the presidency on July 14, 1922. To date, Day was the longest-serving chancellor of the University.

Writing 
Day was an author and wrote The Raid on Prosperity (1907) and My Neighbor the Workingman.

Death 
Day died in Atlantic City, New Jersey, on March 13, 1923.

See also
List of chancellors of Syracuse University
List of Syracuse University buildings
Archbold Stadium
John Dustin Archbold

References

External links 

 "Chancellor James Roscoe Day Papers," Syracuse University Archives
 Obituary, The New York Times, March 13, 1923.

19th-century American male writers
People from Washington County, Maine
Presidents of Syracuse University
Methodists from Maine
1845 births
1923 deaths
New York State College of Forestry
19th-century American non-fiction writers